Dennis J. Clare  (1853-1928) was a professional baseball player who played infield for the  Brooklyn Atlantics team of the NAPBBP. He played in two games for the Atlantics during the season.

References

External links

1853 births
1928 deaths
19th-century baseball players
Brooklyn Atlantics players
Burials at Holy Cross Cemetery, Brooklyn